State Highway 65 (SH 65) is a State Highway in Kerala, India that starts in Parappanangadi and ends in Areacode. The highway is 44.1 km long.

The Route Map 
Parappanangadi – Thirurangadi – AR Nagar – Kondotty – Kizhisseri
 - Puthalam junction (joins Koyilandy - Edavanna SH at Puthalam jn 1.6 km away from Areacode)

See also 
Roads in Kerala
List of State Highways in Kerala

References 

State Highways in Kerala
Roads in Malappuram district